Pittyvaich distillery was a producer of single malt Scotch whisky that operated between 1974 and 1993.

History
The Pittyvaich distillery, built in 1974 by Arthur Bell & Sons, was among the youngest Scottish distilleries while it was operating. It stood near the Dufftown Distillery in Dufftown.

Originally built to provide malt whisky for blends, Pittyvaich eventually did release an official bottling in 1991. Prior to the official bottling, a number of independent bottlers (including Signatory Vintage and Cadenhead's) released Pittyvaich as a single malt.

The distillery was demolished in 2002.

External links
Scotch Whisky
Malt Madness 

1974 establishments in Scotland
1993 disestablishments in Scotland
Defunct companies of Scotland
Scottish malt whisky
Distilleries in Scotland
Food and drink companies established in 1974
Companies based in Morris County, New Jersey
Demolished buildings and structures in Scotland
Buildings and structures demolished in 2002
British companies disestablished in 1993
British companies established in 1974